"The Ballad of John and Yoko" is a song by the English rock band the Beatles that was released as a non-album single in May 1969. It was written by John Lennon and credited to the Lennon–McCartney partnership, and chronicles the events surrounding the wedding of Lennon and Yoko Ono. The song was the Beatles' 17th and final UK number-one single. In the United States, it was banned by some radio stations due to the lyrics' reference to Christ and crucifixion. The single peaked at number 8 on the US Billboard Hot 100. The song has subsequently appeared on compilation albums such as Hey Jude,  1967–1970 and 1.

Writing

Lennon wrote the song while he and Ono were on their honeymoon in Paris. It describes the events of the couple's wedding, in March 1969, and highly publicised honeymoon activities, including their "Bed-In" at the Amsterdam Hilton Hotel and their demonstration of "bagism". In an interview with Alan Smith of the NME published in May 1969, Lennon described it as "Johnny B. Paperback Writer"; in a 1980 interview, he said it was "a piece of journalism".

Lennon took the song to Paul McCartney at the latter's home in St John's Wood, London, on 14 April, eager to record it that evening. Recalling the controversy engendered by Lennon's "more popular than Jesus" remarks in 1966, McCartney was alarmed at the references to Christ in the new song but agreed to assist Lennon. Ono later said: "Paul knew that people were being nasty to John, and he just wanted to make it well for him. Paul has a very brotherly side to him."

Recording
Lennon and McCartney recorded the song without their bandmates George Harrison, who was abroad, and Ringo Starr, who was filming The Magic Christian. McCartney recalled that Lennon was so convinced the song had to be recorded immediately, he was "on heat, so to speak". Reflecting the unusual situation, the session tapes include the following exchange:
 Lennon (on guitar): "Go a bit faster, Ringo."
 McCartney (on drums): "OK, George!"

In choosing to collaborate on the song, Lennon and McCartney set aside the antagonism that existed between them during a period when McCartney was outvoted in the Beatles' choice of a new manager for their failing business enterprise, Apple Corps. The recording also marked the return of Geoff Emerick as recording engineer at a Beatles session, after he had quit working with the group in July 1968 during the tense White Album sessions. Commenting in the Beatles Anthology book, Harrison said: "I didn't mind not being on the record, because it was none of my business... If it had been 'The Ballad of John, George and Yoko', then I would have been on it."

Music critic Richie Unterberger comments on the historical significance of the seven-hour session since it produced "probably some of the final tapes of Lennon and McCartney working closely together, alone". In Beatles historian Mark Lewisohn's description, the session tapes challenge the typical reports of Lennon and McCartney's relationship becoming acrimonious in 1969, as the pair's "great talent, humour, musical understanding and togetherness shone through from start to finish".

Mark Hertsgaard of The New Yorker, the only other writer known to have heard the tapes, attended a private listening session in London with Lewisohn in January 1994. Soon afterwards, Hertsgaard wrote that Lewisohn had again enthused about Lennon and McCartney's camaraderie and "musical kinship", but he himself detected "a forced, polite quality to their joking, and none of the enthusiastic electricity heard during earlier Beatles sessions ... They are coming apart, and they know it."

Release

Although Lennon was impatient to issue the single, its release was delayed to allow for the Beatles' April 1969 single, "Get Back". Backed with Harrison's "Old Brown Shoe", the single was issued in the United Kingdom on 30 May 1969. Lennon and Ono were performing a second bed-in at the Queen Elizabeth Hotel in Montreal at the time. The United States release followed on 4 June.

In the UK and Europe, "The Ballad of John and Yoko" was the first Beatles single to be issued in stereo. It was therefore their first release not given a mono mix. Lennon advised Tony Bramwell, Apple Records' promotions manager, to limit pre-release previews of the record and not to give it any advance publicity, especially with regard to "the Christ! bit". In his NME interview at this time, Lennon said that although the story had already emerged that Harrison and Starr did not play on the song, he would not have chosen to publicise this, adding, "It doesn't mean anything, it just so happened that there were only us two there."

In the US, Apple issued the record in a picture sleeve containing two photos of the Beatles and Ono in the garden of McCartney's London home, taken by Linda McCartney. The front of the sleeve shows Lennon and Ono seated, and Harrison, McCartney and Starr standing behind them. According to author Bruce Spizer, Lennon's bandmates appear uncomfortable ceding the spotlight to Ono and in better humour in the shot used for "Old Brown Shoe", on the reverse of the sleeve.

In New Zealand it was considered unfit for Government-regulated radio broadcast (NZBC), and was edited locally to omit the word 'Christ' in each chorus and replace it with just a drum beat. As there were some 50 NZBC radio stations at the time it's thought that perhaps only 50 copies may have been pressed.  

The single was accompanied by two promotional clips assembled from footage of some of Lennon and Ono's public activities – all of which the couple routinely filmed – between July 1968 and April 1969. The first clip was broadcast three times on Top of the Pops and contains footage from four events. When shown on the Australian TV show Rage long afterwards, in black and white, this version had the word "Christ" bleeped out in the choruses with an on-screen starburst effect. In the second film, broadcast on the US show The Music Scene, a traffic sign containing an exclamation mark appears each time the word is heard. This film is made up of footage from considerably more events, showing Lennon and Ono in London, Paris, Amsterdam and Vienna, among other locations; for this reason, according to author John Winn, it "illustrates the lyrics much more effectively" than the first clip.

The song has been included on several compilation albums: Hey Jude (US, 1970), 1967–1970 (1973), 20 Greatest Hits (UK, 1982), Past Masters, Volume Two (1988) and 1 (2000). Apple's electronic press kit for 1 included a new colour print of the US promo clip.

Reception
In his review of the single in the NME, John Wells said he found "The Ballad of John and Yoko" profoundly moving as an account of people's attitude towards Lennon and Ono, and only the "raw, earthy rock" backing stopped him succumbing to tears. He described it as a "stormer" but predicted that the record's sales would be affected by "Get Back"'s ongoing chart success.

The single became the Beatles' 17th and final UK number 1. In the US, it peaked at number 8 on the Billboard Hot 100. On the other national charts there, it reached number 10 in Cash Box and number 7 in Record World. Several US radio stations declined to broadcast the song because of the use of the words "Christ" and "crucify" in the chorus:

"The Ballad of John and Yoko" never appeared on the surveys of WLS in Chicago or WABC in New York, two of the largest Top 40 stations in the US. The word "Christ" was censored (by being "bleeped out") for radio airplay in Australia. The Spanish government under Franco objected to the song because of the phrase "Gibraltar near Spain". The status of Gibraltar is a long-running subject of debate between Spain and the United Kingdom.

When cartoonist Al Capp visited Lennon and Ono at their 1969 Bed-In for Peace in Montreal, he pointedly asked Lennon about the meaning of the song's lyrics. Their testy exchange, which included Capp referring to Ono as "Madame Nhu", later appeared in the 1988 documentary film Imagine: John Lennon. On Capp's exit, Lennon sang an impromptu version with a slightly revised lyric that stated, "They're gonna crucify Capp!"

In 2012, "The Ballad of John and Yoko" was ranked as the 404th best classic rock song of all time by New York's Q104.3. Less impressed, Alex Petridis of The Guardian ranks the song last of the Beatles' 22 UK singles, saying: "John Lennon once convened a meeting of the Beatles to inform them that he was Jesus: the charmless 'Ballad of John and Yoko' is that crazed egotism and messiah complex wrought into song." Rolling Stone ranked it at number 48 on the magazine's list of the 100 greatest Beatles songs.

Personnel
According to Ian MacDonald and Mark Lewisohn:
 John Lennon – lead vocal, lead guitars, acoustic guitar, percussion
 Paul McCartney – bass guitar, drums, piano, maracas, harmony vocal

Charts

Weekly charts

Year-end charts

Certifications and sales

Notes

References

Sources

External links
 

1969 songs
1969 singles
The Beatles songs
Apple Records singles
Songs written by Lennon–McCartney
Song recordings produced by George Martin
Songs published by Northern Songs
Number-one singles in Australia
Number-one singles in Belgium
Number-one singles in Germany
Irish Singles Chart number-one singles
Number-one singles in Mexico
Number-one singles in Norway
Number-one singles in Switzerland
UK Singles Chart number-one singles
Obscenity controversies in music
Songs based on actual events
Songs about the media
Songs about John Lennon
Songs about Yoko Ono
Songs about Amsterdam
Songs about hotels and motels
Songs about Paris
Songs about Vienna
Cultural depictions of Jesus
British folk rock songs
British rock-and-roll songs
Religious controversies in music